Juan Manuel Sánchez Gordillo (born 5 February 1952) is a Spanish politician, labour leader and history school teacher. Since 1979 he has been the Mayor of Marinaleda and since 2008 MP for United Left (UL) in the Parliament of Andalusia. He is also leader of the party Collective for the Unity of Workers - Andalusian Left Bloc (CUT-BAI), part of UF and the rural workers's union Andalusian Workers' Union.

Sánchez Gordillo has a long history of participating in militant action for the benefit of Spanish working class. He helped to transform Marinaleda from a town blighted by rural poverty into what Sánchez Gordillo himself and The Guardian have described as a "communist utopia", where since the early 1990s there has been no need for mortgages—the town has "virtually full employment, communally owned land and wage equality". In August 2012 the town had only 5% unemployment, mostly recent arrivals and economic migrants, contrasting with the rest of Spain where unemployment is at 25%, and at 34% in Andalusia.

Robin Hood raids
In mid August 2012, Sánchez Gordillo attracted considerable media attention both within Spain and internationally due to his role in raids on supermarkets in nearby towns, Seville and Cádiz, where food was stolen and handed out to poor families and to food banks. The items stolen were part of a list chiefly made of rice, sugar, pasta, milk, olive oil and flour. Sánchez Gordillo did not personally remove food, but was outside in the car parks while members of his union conducted the raids. Several of these members have been arrested and later released, though Sánchez Gordillo  himself has immunity from prosecution. Sánchez Gordillo has however said he is happy to waive his immunity and go to jail for his cause, in fact he said he expected to be jailed in order to make his message spread further. English speaking media have widely reported that Sánchez Gordillo is seen as a hero and a "national celebrity" within Spain, comparing him to Robin Hood. A dissenting voice came from Jonathan Blitzer of the New York Times, who suggested he may fail to live up to the hype and be more like a Don Quixote.
Sánchez Gordillo has also been called a modern Robin Hood and "the revolutionary of Andalusia" by several Spanish newspapers, including the center-left El País. Gordillo has been criticised by several Spanish citizens and officials, including Alfonso Alonso, a spokesman for the governing People's Party in Spain's national parliament, who said "One can’t be Robin Hood and at the same time earning a salary as the sheriff of Nottingham".

2012 anti-austerity march
On 16 August, Gordillo set off on a three-week march to Madrid; on the way he planned to occupy banks and to persuade local authorities to default on their debts and refuse to implement austerity.  So far this has included a brief occupation of a Unicaja branch in Mancha Real.

2013 sentence 
In November 2013 a Spanish court sentenced Sánchez Gordillo and four others to seven months in prison for occupying unused military land they wanted to be loaned to farmers hard hit by the economic crisis.

References

Further reading
 Utopia and the Valley of Tears: A journey through the Spanish crisis, Dan Hancox (2012) [a Kindle ebook about Sanchez Gordillo and the town of Marinaleda].
 Dan Hancox. (2014). The Village Against the World London: Verso.

External links
 "Marinaleda, el pueblo ‘comunista’ que subsiste por obra y gracia del capitalismo" 

Living people
1952 births
Spanish schoolteachers
Spanish communists
Spanish trade union leaders
Mayors of places in Andalusia
Members of the Parliament of Andalusia
Spanish politicians convicted of crimes